This was the first edition of the event.

Garbiñe Muguruza won the title, defeating Ons Jabeur in the final, 3–6, 6–3, 6–0.

Seeds
The top eight seeds received a bye into the second round.

Draw

Finals

Top half

Section 1

Section 2

Bottom half

Section 3

Section 4

Qualifying

Seeds

Qualifiers

Lucky losers

Draw

First qualifier

Second qualifier

Third qualifier

Fourth qualifier

Fifth qualifier

Sixth qualifier

Seventh qualifier

Eighth qualifier

External links
Main draw
Qualifying draw

2021 WTA Tour